The Ken McKenzie Trophy was awarded annually by the International Hockey League to the American-born player judged to be most outstanding in his first season. The award is named for Ken McKenzie, the co-founder and longtime president and publisher of The Hockey News.

Winners

References
Ken McKenzie Trophy www.hockeydb.com

 

International Hockey League (1945–2001) trophies